The Stagecoach Festival is an outdoor country music festival held annually at the Empire Polo Club in Indio, California. Various artists attend, whether they be mainstream or relatively unknown, ranging from folk, mainstream country, bluegrass, roots rock, americana and alternative country. It is the highest-grossing festival centered on country music in the world. The festival is presented by Goldenvoice, The Messina Group, and Moore Entertainment and acts as a sister event to Goldenvoice's Coachella Valley Music and Arts Festival, taking place the following weekend at the same site. The 2020 and 2021 Stagecoach Festivals were cancelled due to the COVID-19 pandemic. On June 1, 2021, Stagecoach announced its 2022 return. The country music festival took place between April 29 and May 1, 2022.

History
Stagecoach took place for the first time in 2007. Put on at the same venue, also by Goldenvoice, Stagecoach is seen as a "cousin" of Coachella. In 2012, the festival's 55,000 attendees marked its first sell-out crowd. In 2018, Stagecoach set a new attendance record with 75,000 attendees.

Notable performers have included Brad Paisley, Jason Aldean, Kenny Chesney, Brooks and Dunn, Toby Keith, Miranda Lambert, Blake Shelton, Sugarland, The Charlie Daniels Band, Alabama. George Strait, Alan Jackson, Willie Nelson, Eagles, Roger McGuinn, Rascal Flatts, Taylor Swift, Tim McGraw, Carrie Underwood, Keith Urban, Martina McBride, Don Williams, Jerry Lee Lewis, Shania Twain, Luke Bryan, Garth Brooks, and Eric Church.

In 2020, Stagecoach had initially been scheduled for April, was then moved to October 23–25 due to the COVID-19 pandemic, and on June 10 went (like Coachella) on hiatus by an order from the Riverside County public health official. The hiatus was extended the next year.

In recent years, Stagecoach has become somewhat of a hotspot for fans and contestants of the reality dating show The Bachelor, with numerous contestants from Bachelor Nation being invited to attend the festival and post pictures on Instagram. It was revealed that initial drama on Season 6 of the Bachelor spinoff Bachelor in Paradise  resulted from romantic relationships that took place at the music festival earlier in the year. Sections of the 2018 film A Star Is Born, starring Bradley Cooper and Lady Gaga, were filmed at Stagecoach.

Camping
The facilities provide on-site camping for some festival-goers. The Desert Sun published an article on the camping, reporting that some attendees think that it, as a standalone event, is almost on par with the concerts.
The 2013 festival's tent/car camping policy was eliminated and the RV camping rules altered due to the overwhelming 55,000 person sellout crowd at the 2012 festival. The new rules were to stand until Goldenvoice decided on a different approach.

Festival cuisine
The festival showcases a variety of food and beverages to enjoy over the course of the weekend. Some of the restaurants expected for the 2013 festival were Jackelope Ranch, Las Casuelas, Ruth's Chris Steakhouse, Fisherman's Market & Grill, and vendors like Spicy Pie, Pink's Hot Dogs, and Waffleman Ice Cream Sandwiches. There are also full bars, a Cantina Restaurant, BBQ contest, and a pancake breakfast supporting the local Lions Club.

Kansas City BBQ Society (KCBS) sanctioned the Stagecoach Invitational BBQ Championship encompassing teams from across the nation competing for the KCBS California State championship.

Grand champions
2008 - Sug's Shack BBQ & BLQUE Cuttin Edge Que
2009 - Rhythm N' Que & Lotta Bull
2010 - Lotta Bull West
2011 - All Sauced Up
2012 - El Fuego Fiasco

Lineups by year

See also
 Coachella Valley Music and Arts Festival
 Country Thunder

References

External links

 Stagecoach Festival

Music festivals in California
Indio, California
Annual events in Riverside County, California
Music festivals established in 2007
Country music festivals in the United States
2007 establishments in California